The massacres of Albanians in the Balkan Wars were perpetrated on several occasions by the Montenegrin and Serbian armies and paramilitaries during the conflicts that occurred in the region between 1912 and 1913. During the 1912–13 First Balkan War, Serbia and Montenegro committed a number of war crimes against the Albanian population after expelling Ottoman Empire forces from present-day Albania and Kosovo, which were reported by the European, American and Serbian opposition press. Most of the crimes occurred between October 1912 and the summer of 1913. The goal of the forced expulsions and massacres was statistical manipulation before the London Ambassadors Conference to determine the new Balkan borders. According to contemporary accounts, between 10,000 and 25,000 Albanians were killed or died because of hunger and cold during that period. Many of the victims were children, women and the elderly. In addition to the massacres, some civilians had their lips and noses severed.

According to Philip J. Cohen, the Serbian Army generated so much fear that some Albanian women killed their children rather than let them fall into the hands of Serbian soldiers. The Carnegie Commission, an international fact-finding mission, concluded that the Serbian and Montenegrin armies perpetrated large-scale violence for "the entire transformation of the ethnic character of regions inhabited exclusively by Albanians". Cohen, examining the Carnegie Endowment for International Peace report, said that Serbian soldiers cut off the ears, noses and tongues of Albanian civilians and gouged out their eyes. Cohen also cited Durham as saying that Serbian soldiers helped bury people alive in Kosovo.

The Committee of Kosovo reported that during this period, about 23,000 Albanians died in Serbian, Montenegrin and Greek prisons. According to an Albanian imam organization, there were around 21,000 simple graves in Kosovo where Albanians were massacred by the Serbian armies. In August and September 1913, Serbian forces destroyed 140 villages and forced 40,000 Albanians to flee. American relief commissioner Willar Howard said in a 1914 Daily Mirror interview that General Carlos Popovitch would shout, "Don't run away, we are brothers and friends. We don't mean to do any harm." Peasants who trusted Popovitch were shot or burned to death, and elderly women unable to leave their homes were also burned. Howard said that the atrocities were committed after the war ended.

According to Leo Freundlich's 1912 report, Popovitch was responsible for many of the Albanian massacres and became captain of the Serb troops in Durrës. Serbian Generals Datidas Arkan and Bozo Jankovic were authorized to kill anyone who blocked Serbian control of Kosovo. Yugoslavia from a Historical Perspective, a 2017 study published in Belgrade by the Helsinki Committee for Human Rights in Serbia, said that villages were burned to ashes and Albanian Muslims forced to flee when Serbo-Montenegrin forces invaded Kosovo in 1912. Some chronicles cited decapitation as well as mutilation. Leon Trotsky estimated that about 25,000 Albanians died, and Pierre Loti estimated that around 70,000 Muslims died in the Balkan Wars. A 2000 report examining Freundlich's collection of international news stories about the atrocities estimated that of Kosovo's 1.1 million inhabitants, about 50,000 were victims.

Background
The Albanian-Serbian conflict has its roots in the expulsion of the Albanians in 1877-1878 from areas which were incorporated into the Principality of Serbia. Before the outbreak of the First Balkan War, the Albanians were fighting for a nation state. A mid-1912 Albanian revolt resulted in Ottoman recognition of the "14 Points", a list of demands which included the establishment of an Albanian Vilayet. The push for Albanian autonomy and Ottoman weakness were seen by contemporary regional Christian Balkan powers as threatening their Christian population with extermination. According to Albanian scholarship, the realisation of Albanian aspirations was received negatively by Bulgaria, Serbia, Montenegro and Greece. The Balkan League (Serbia, Montenegro, Greece and Bulgaria) attacked the Ottoman Empire and, during the next few months, partitioned all Ottoman territory inhabited by Albanians. The kingdoms of Serbia and Greece occupied most of present-day Albania and other Albanian-inhabited lands on the Adriatic coast. Montenegro occupied a portion of present-day northern Albania, around Shkodër. According to Dimitrije Tucović, Serbia doubled its territory. Most Albanian historians say that Montenegro, Greece and Serbia did not recognise Albanian autonomy, and the Balkan Wars were fought to stop it on Ottoman lands they claimed.

When the Serbo-Montenegrin forces invaded the Vilayet of Kosovo in 1912, much of the Albanian population fled due to the feared (and actual) violence they experienced at the hands of the invading armies. The Serb military effort to conquer Kosovo had overtones of extermination due to Serb retaliation against Albanians affecting children and women, including the killing of women and men and the destruction of homes. During this period, 235 villages were burned down: 133 by Serb forces and 102 by the Montenegrins. Steven Schwarts writes that during the capture of Durrës, Shkodër and Shengjin, Serbian soldiers massacred and pillaged poor Albanians. According to the Albanian Armend Bekaj, the Serbian invasion of Kosovo was illegal. Anna Di Lellio writes that the Serbian expansion campaign forced Albanians to accept a Serb nationalist ideology which made them feel like a minority in their homeland.

Massacres

Vilayet of Scutari

Malësia
A number of reports surfaced about violent Montenegrin persecutions of Catholic Albanians. In Montenegrin-controlled districts, Catholic and Muslim Albanians were subject to forced mass conversions to Orthodox Christianity.

Shkodër
When Serbo-Montenegrin soldiers invaded Shkodër, about 10,000 Montenegrins soldiers died. Equating Albanians with Turks, the invading armies enacted a revenge on the population for the way they had been treated centuries prior by Turks. The city was looted, and civilians (including the sick and wounded and women and children, many of whom were Christian) were massacred. In late 1913, international pressure resulted in the withdrawal of Serbian forces from Shkodër; according to the city's Austro-Hungarian consul, Serb troops killed about 600 Albanians.

Morinë
In 1912, Serbian forces entered Qafë Morinë and killed 15 civilians.

Krasniq
A British captain who was aiding a general spoke with incoming Albanian refugees and reported, "In Rugova, Peja, Plav and Gusinje, the Serb army attacked Albanians who proclaimed their national identity. In Krasniq, any Albanian that stayed behind was massacred by the Serbian army".

Vilayet of Kosovo 
The Austro-Hungarian consulate in Belgrade reported that during February 1913, Serbian military forces executed all Albanian inhabitants of the villages of Kabash, Tërpezë, Lubisht and Gjylekar. Chetniks razed the Albanian quarter of Skopje and killed a number of the city's Albanian inhabitants. Numerous reports from the Balkan Wars including the series of articles from then journalist Leon Trotsky recorded state-organized massacres in numerous locations including Ferizaj, Gjakova, Gjilan, Pristina and Prizren with the total number of deaths at around 25,000.

Pristina
When villagers heard about the Serbian massacres of Albanians in the nearby villages, some houses took the desperate measure of raising white flag to protect themselves. In the cases the white flag was ignored during the attack of Serbian army on Prishtina in October 1912, the Albanians (led by Ottoman and Ottoman Albanian officers) abused the white flag, and attacked and killed all the Serbian soldiers. The Serbian army subsequently used this as an excuse for the brutal retaliation against civilians.

The army entered Pristina on 22 October. Albanian and Turkish households were looted and destroyed, and women and children were killed. A Danish journalist based in Skopje reported that the Serbian campaign in Pristina "had taken on the character of a horrific massacring of the Albanian population". An estimated 5,000 people in Pristina were murder in the early days of the Serbian occupation. The events have been interpreted as an early attempt to change the region's demographics. Serbian settlers were brought into the city, and Serbian Prime Minister Nikola Pašić bought  of land. Pristinans who wore a plis were targeted by the Serbian army; those who wore the Turkish fez were safe, and the price of a fez rose steeply.

Gazimestan
When Serb forces entered Gazimestan in 1913, they killed 5,000 Albanians.

Gjakova
Gjakova suffered at the hands of the Serbian-Montenegrin army. The New York Times reported that people on the gallows hanged on both sides of the road, and the road to Gjakova became a "gallows alley." The regional Montenegrin paramilitary abused the Albanian population.

Serbian priests forcibly converted Albanian Catholics to Serbian Orthodoxy. According to a 20 March 1913 Neue Freie Presse article, Orthodox priests and the military converted 300 Gjakova Catholics to the Orthodox faith; Franciscan Pater Angelus, who refused to renounce his faith, was tortured and killed with bayonets. The History Institute in Pristina reported that Montenegro converted over 1,700 Albanian Catholics to the Serbian Orthodox faith in the Gjakova region in March 1913. Albert von Mensdorff-Pouilly-Dietrichstein told Edward Grey in a 10 March 1912 interview that Serbian soldiers behaved in a "barbarous way" toward Muslim and Catholic Albanians in Gjakova.

Prizren
When the Serbian army controlled the city of Prizren, it imposed repressive measures against the Albanian civil population; Serbian detachments broke into houses, plundered, committed acts of violence, and killed indiscriminately. About 400 people were "eradicated" during the first days of Serbian occupation. About 1,500 Albanian bodies lay in the streets, and foreign reporters were barred from the city. After the Serbian military and paramilitary operation, Prizren became known as "the kingdom of death". General Božidar Janković forced the city's surviving Albanian leaders to sign a statement expressing gratitude to Serbian King Peter I Karađorđević for their liberation. An estimated 5,000 Albanians were killed in and around Prizren. British traveller Edith Durham and a British military attaché were supposed to visit Prizren in October 1912, but the trip was cancelled by the authorities. Durham said, "I asked wounded Montengrins [soldiers] why I was not allowed to go and they laughed and said 'We have not left a nose on an Albanian up there!' Not a pretty sight for a British officer." Durham eventually visited a northern Albanian outpost in Kosovo, where she met captured Ottoman soldiers whose upper lips and noses had been cut off.

Although Prizren offered no resistance to Serb forces, it did not avert a bloodbath; Prizren was the second-hardest-hit Albanian city, after Pristina. Serb forces invaded homes and abused anyone in their way, and up to 400 people died in the first few days of the Serbian occupation. When the Serbian troops set off westwards, they could not find horses to transport their equipment and used 200 Albanians; most collapsed along the way.

Many Albanians fled to the Austrian consulate, where Oscar Prochazka greeted them. The Serbs demanded that they be given up, and the consul refused; the Serbs then stormed the consulate.

Rugova
In 1913, General Janko Vukotić told Edith Durham that his soldiers had committed atrocities against the civilian population of Rugova. In response to her protests, he reportedly said: "But they are beasts, savage animals. We have done very well". Slovene author Božidar Jezernik interprets this as attesting the Montenegrin goal of removing local Muslims from their newly captured territories and resettling them.

Ferizaj
The capture of Ferizovik (as the town was known in Ottoman times) by the Serbian army and the subsequent events were documented in contemporary accounts. The entry of the Serbian army was followed by a massacre of the population. Leo Freundlich recorded contemporary reports in Albania's Golgotha. According to the war correspondent from Rome's Il Messaggero, the town was destroyed and most of its inhabitants were killed. A Catholic priest in the region reported that resistance was strong for three days against the advancing Serbian army. When the town was finally taken, local residents who were fleeing were invited back if they surrendered their weapons. After they did, the army killed 300 to 400 people; only a few Muslim families remained. Freundlich estimated the total number of deaths at 1,200.

Luma

Serb military forces entered Luma in 1912 and attacked local inhabitants, killed tribal chieftains, seized cattle and razed villages. This triggered a local uprising. Serb forces retaliated with a scorched-earth policy and widespread killing; young and old, men and women were barricaded in mosques and houses and shot or burned. Twenty-five thousand people fled to Kosovo and western Macedonia. According to Mark Levene, the events were a "localized genocide".

When General Božidar Janković saw that the region's Albanians would not allow Serbian forces to continue advancing to the Adriatic Sea, he ordered his troops to continue their brutality. The Serbian army killed men, women and children and burned down 100-200 houses and 27 villages in the Luma region. Reports cited Serbian army atrocities, including the burning of women and children tied to haystacks in front of their husbands and fathers. about 400 men from Luma surrendered to Serbian authorities, and were brought to Prizren and killed. According to a Daily Telegraph story, "All the horrors of history have been outdone by the atrocious conduct of the troops of General Jankovic".

The second Luma massacre occurred the following year. After the Conference of the Ambassadors decided that Luma should be part of Albania, the Serbian army initially refused to withdraw. The Albanians rebelled in September 1913, and Luma again experienced harsh retaliation from the Serbian army. A report of the International Commission cited a letter from a Serbian soldier who described the punitive expedition against the rebel Albanians:

A December 1913 article in the Italian daily newspaper Corriere delle Puglie described an official report which was sent to the Great Powers detailing the massacre of Albanians in Luma and Debar after an amnesty was declared by Serbian authorities. The report listed the people killed by Serbian units with their cause of death, which included burning and bayoneting. The report also listed the burned and looted villages in the Luma and Has regions. A Franciscan priest who visited Luma reported seeing "poor bayonetted babies" on the streets.

Opoja and Restelica
After the defeat at Lumë, Serbian troops were ordered to exterminate the population of the villages of Opoja, Gora, Bellobrad, Brrut, Rrenc, Bresanë, Zym and Qafëleshi. Thousands of men, women and children were killed and their houses burned down. Survivors hid in the mountains or in wells where some suffocated; in one case, a mother held her infant above the water. Some were killed at local bridges, and their bodies were eaten by dogs. Local gypsies greeted the Serbian troops with drums and music; they were killed and buried in the Opoja mosque. In the Restelica region, 13 districts were burned down.

Kumanovo
British army officer Christopher Birdwood Thomson was told by a Serbian general in Belgrade in 1913 that after the 3rd Serbian Army defeated the Turkish forces in Kumanovo, they entered the city and wiped out entire villages—massacring men, women and children in their homes, and forcing others to flee to their deaths from famine and cold. In 1920, he wrote: "Nothing more terrible has taken place in any part of the world, or in the whole history of war".

Gostivar
After the Battle of Kumanovo on 23–24 October 1912, the Morava division of the Serbian army entered Gostivar. Hundreds of Albanians were killed, resulting in protests from Vienna. Leopold Berchtold, appalled by the massacre, asked Belgrade to withdraw from Albanian territory. On 21 November 1912, he wrote letters to Paris, London, Berlin, Rome and Petrograd: "The behavior of the Serbian army towards the Albanian people does not belong to any international human rights norm, but after the occupation of the countries they choose no means of dealing with it anymore. They acted brutally against the innocent and defenseless population".

Uskub 
Vice-consul W. D. Peckham was informed by the Catholic curate of Skopje and Ferizaj, who visited him on 27 February 1913, that thousands of Albanians had been killed and hundreds tortured. Serbian soldiers broke into the house of an Albanian family, raped the wife and beat the husband until he told them where his daughters were hiding; his daughters were then also raped.

Mitrovica
On 18 November 1912, Sir F. Cartwright wrote to Sir Edward Grey that the Serbian army entered Mitrovica, arrested the Austrian consul, and held him prisoner for 15 days; the consul escaped to Budapest after witnessing atrocities against Albanian civilians. According to a 1912 Japan Times article, the Austrian consuls in Prizren and Mitrovica were arrested because the Serbian government did not want news to reach Austria that Serbian soldiers had massacred Albanian civilians.

Vushtrri
Serbian soldiers killed 17 Albanian civilians when they entered Vushtrri on 13 August 1913. The killings were documented in a letter from British vice-consul W. D. Peckham in Skopje to British ambassador Ralph Paget in Belgrade.

Pejë
The Serbian army bombarded the city of Pejë and razed villages in 1912, aided by Chetniks. Edith Durham wrote about refugees from Peć after the Serbian army entered the city in 1913: 

About 10,000 Albanians in Peć were forcibly converted.

Novi Pazar
Carlo Papa di Castiglione d'Asti (1869-1955), an Italian major and military attaché in Belgrade and Bucharest from 1908 to 1913, observed the advancing Serbian army. He reported that the army exterminated the Albanian population of Novi Pazar to facilitate Serbian domination. When Serb troops entered the Sanjak of Novi Pazar, hundreds of civilians were killed. The Ibar Army under General Mihailo Zivkovic entered the sanjak and pacified the Albanian population with "soletudinem faciunt pacem appelant" ("They make a desert and call it peace").

Vilayet of Monastir 

In the town of Ohrid, Serbian forces killed 500 Albanians and Turks.

Dibra
On 20 September 1913, the Serbian Army carried off all the cattle in Dibër, Malësia. Although the herdsmen fought back, all were killed. The Serbians also killed two Lumë chieftains (Mehmet Edhemi and Xhaferr Elezi) and pillaged and burned the villages of Peshkopi, Blliçë and Dohoshisht in lower Dibër County and seven other villages in upper Dibër County. Women, children and old people were tortured and killed.

As the army invaded Albania through Dibra, Elbasan and Shkodër, they bombarded cities and villages with artillery. The Albanian government telegraphed their delegates in Paris that Serbia's aim was to suppress the Albanian state and exterminate the Albanian population.

American relief commissioner William Howard said in a 1914 Daily Mirror interview that Serbian troops destroyed 100 villages (with 12,000 houses) in Dibra, and 4,000 to 8,000 Albanians were burned, bayonetted or shot to death. When Serbian troops looted the villages of Dibra, armed Albanians killed the soldiers. The Serbs responded by burning down 24 villages.

Pelagonia
Serb majors M. Vasić and Vasilije Trbić gathered 30 Chetniks in September 1912 and travelled to Desovo, where they shot 111 Albanian men and razed the village. In nearby Brailovo, Trbić executed 60 Albanians.

Porcasi and Sulp
In the villages, Serbian soldiers took the men out and asked the women to pay for their release. They were put inside a mosque after payment, which was blown up. In Sulp, 73 Albanians were also killed.

Tirana
In Tirana, many Albanians were beaten to death by local Serb troops.

Eyewitness reports
For 12 years, British anthropologist Edith Durham travelled to the region and became knowledgeable about Albania and Albanians. Durham was in Montenegro in August 1912, saw Montenegrin preparations for war along the border, and alerted the British press; she thought that Montenegro was attempting to provoke the Ottomans into a conflict, and witnessed the outbreak of hostilities when Montenegrin King Nicholas ordered his army to fire artillery shots into Albania. As the war began, Durham sent news to the British press; for some time, she was the only war correspondent from Montenegro. Durham wrote for the Evening Chronicle and the Manchester Guardian before learning that the papers "were cutting and even doctoring her articles".

Early in the conflict, Durham (a nurse) was involved in relief work with the Red Cross and became aware of the atrocities. Close to the hostilities, she described razed villages and refugees; some had to shelter in outhouses. Writing a strongly-worded indictment of Serb and Montenegrin behavior, she visited over a thousand families whose homes were razed and noted the negative view Montenegrins had of Albanians. Durham encountered front-line soldiers such as a Serb officer who viewed his time in Kosovo as "heroism" and "nearly choked with laughter" as he talked about "bayonet[ing] the women and children of Luma". She heard other officers say that "no one would dare speak the dirty language" (Albanian) in the newly acquired territories, and they told her openly about the violence used to convert Catholic and Muslim Albanians to Orthodox Christianity. At the Montenegrin-Albanian frontier, Durham described "nose cutting" and other mutilation for "their commanders". She ended her friendship with King Nicholas because of the Montenegrin army's actions. The Albanian leadership used Durham's reports to strengthen their nationalist rhetoric, objecting to the violence committed by armies in the region.

Leon Trotsky, sent by a socialist Kiev newspaper to cover the Balkan Wars, reported on the violence against Albanians. A few days after Skopje came under Serb control, Trotsky described the situation in and around the city. He was not in the theatre of war, compiling his information from discussions with witnesses such as a Serbian friend who referred to "horrors" in Macedonia. The friend had obtained a military pass to travel to Skopje, and told Trotsky:

Trotsky's account from his Serbian friend referred to the actions of Serb troops in Skopje: looting, arson and torture of its Albanian inhabitants, about which they spoke publicly. Many of the Skopje atrocities were committed at night by Serb paramilitaries; in the morning, hundreds of headless Albanian corpses were in the Vardar River at the main bridge. Although it was certain that the bodies were not casualties of war, it was unknown if they were Albanians from the area or had floated down from the upper Vardar. Albanian villages were burned, and irregular troops invaded homes to kill and loot. Trotsky's Serbian friend said that Skopje had become a military camp, and Serb peasant troops looted food, livestock and doors and windows from Albanian houses. He expressed disgust with Serbian officer brutality, but a corporal told him that they differed from the komitajis (paramilitaries). According to the corporal, the army "would not kill anyone younger than twelve years of age" but "the komitajis engage in murder, robbery and violence as a savage sport". Army authorities sent some komitajis home due to the embarrassment they caused the military. The Serb informant wrote to Trotsky that "meat is rotting, human flesh as well as the flesh of oxen"; the conflict "brutalized" people and made them lose "their human aspect". Trotsky's Serbian friend encountered a corporal in Kosovo who described his actions as "roasting chickens and killing Arnauts [Albanians]. But we're tired of it." In his report to Kievskaya Misl, Trotsky wrote about the "atrocities committed against the Albanians of Macedonia and Kosovo in the wake of the Serbian invasion of October 1912". He reported that when Peter I of Serbia was on a tour of the front lines, he said that Albanians should be clubbed to death to save ammunition. Trotsky wrote several dispatches describing the atrocities: "An individual, a group, a party or a class that is capable of 'objectively' picking its nose while it watches men drunk with blood, and incited from above, massacring defenceless people is condemned by history to rot and become worm-eaten while it is still alive".

A British Foreign Office report noted a telegram from the Italian consul in Skopje: "Atrocities being committed by Serbian troops and their evident intention of extirpating as many of the Albanian inhabitants as possible". A Swiss engineer employed as an overseer for the Oriental Railway submitted a report to the British embassy in Belgrade detailing Skopje after the arrival of Serbian troops. The report called the conduct of Serbs toward the Muslim population "cruel in every way", appearing to "have for its object their complete extermination". The engineer wrote that the sound of gunfire began early in the day and continued until late; prisoners were treated badly, and officers were shot without trial: "An order was issued to soldiers in certain places to kill all Albanians from the age of eight years upwards with a view to extermination. The Serbians have ill treated the sick, women and children." His report described the destruction of mosques, the razing of villages, and about 500 bodies floating in the Vardar River; "the Albanians were desperate".

Historicity 
Scholarship treats wartime correspondence from the Balkan Wars as first-hand evidence, and historian Wolfgang Höpken says that those sources need to be handled carefully. Höpken says that although reporters (such as Trotsky) who provided firsthand information were not near the theatre of war, Trotsky's accounts of the Balkan Wars were "some of the most brilliant and most analytical war reports".

Contemporary journalists based in the Balkans, such as Richard von Mach from the Kölnische Zeitung, said that accounts were often from a third party or "even pure fiction". Writers like Carl Pauli obtained their information from unnamed witnesses or gathered evidence from the extensive compilation by Leo Freundlich, who wrote about the Albanian conflict zone with empathy for its Albanian victims. According to Höpken, these sources are significant but their information "can hardly be taken for granted".

The oft-cited International Carnegie Commission report "cannot", says Höpken, "be read without a due deconstructative effort on the part of the historian". However, historian Alan Kramer regards the Carnegie Commission report as a "remarkably well-documented and impartial investigation, coolly sceptical of exaggerated claims, reached conclusions that have not been improved to this day." Diplomatic missions in the Balkans repeatedly sent reports of rumors and news about violent acts committed by all participants in the Balkan Wars, and often complainted about their inability to obtain firsthand data. Reports from British consuls described many violent acts committed by Serb irregular forces in Kosovo and Macedonia after their capture in 1912-1913 by the Serbian military. The British government was suspicious of the authenticity of the complaints and reports, and hesitated to undertake political action.

When political relations with Serbia were tense, Austria-Hungary was keenly interested in amassing details of Serbian atrocities and scrutinised the reliability of their sources. Austro-Hungarians said that although there was often "a great deal of exaggeration" of data in their possession, accounts from verified witnesses confirmed the killings of children and women, wide-scale theft and the razing of villages. In Skopje, the Austro-Hungarian consul Heimroth sent his assistants into the field numerous times to examine news of atrocities before sending reports (such as "Gausamkeiten der Serben gegen Albaner") to Vienna.

An extensive report by the Catholic bishop Lazër Mjeda on Serbian violence toward Skopje's Muslim and Albanian inhabitants was the subject of detailed discussion at the Austro-Hungarian consulate, which concluded that the report was well-founded. In his report, Consul Heimroth said that Serbian forces should at least be held to account for not halting the violence against Muslims after their arrival in Skopje. Heimroth said that he received more complaints of wartime violence then he had in the Russo-Japanese War, and a conflict aimed at liberating fellow Christians concluded with an attempt to exterminate non-Orthodox inhabitants.

Nonpartisan witnesses included foreign workers and engineers from the Oriental Railway and local and foreign Christian clergy. Some observers suspected that forced population movements (ethnic cleansing) were part of an organised extermination effort. Höpken finds insufficient support for that position in the sources, and the events "radicalised" the continuing course toward homogenous ethnic populations. Historian Mark Mazower writes that despite the "careless talk of 'exterminating' the Albanian population", the killing of "perhaps thousands of civilians" by Serbian armed forces in the provinces of Kosovo and Monastir was "prompted more by revenge than genocide".

Observations by "reliable" and "non-partisan" informants who witnessed the events "left no doubt", Höpken says, that extensive violence (such as the razing of homes and villages and forced population movements) occurred. Apart from what Höpken calls "suspicious slaughter narratives" in second- and third-hand accounts, doctors and nurses verified that the "conflict had gone beyond all rules and regulations".

In Albanian literature and scholarship, the actions described in Durham's accounts are the outcome of anti-Albanian policies organised by the Serb government to "exterminate Albanians". According to Daut Dauti, Durham's wartime reports "amounted to atrocity testimonies committed against Albanians". Durham's accounts were criticised by Rebecca West, a fellow traveler of the region. West called Durham naive (ridiculing her support of a false 1912 report which claimed that the Austrian consul had been castrated by Serbs in Prizren), but historian Benjamin Lieberman wrote that West has been accused of pro-Serbian bias. Lieberman said that Durham was an eyewitness to the conflict and, in Trotsky's interviews Trotsky with Serbs, his informants lacked a motive to portray their fellow troops (and citizens) negatively. He called Trotsky, Durham and others' accounts consistent and corroborated by additional sources, such as Catholic Church officials who cited multiple massacres.

Reactions
According to Misha Glenny, Serbian press published banner headlines (such as "Get ready for war! The joint Serbo-Bulgarian offensive will start any minute now!") on the eve of war to encouraging patriotic hysteria. French general Frédéric-Georges Herr reported on 3 January 1913 that "in the Albanian massif, the numerous massacres that bloodied this region reduced the population to strong proportions. Many villages were destroyed and the land remained barren". Edith Durham, the European socialists Leo Freundlich and Leon Trotsky, and Serbian socialists such as Kosta Novaković, Dragiša Lapčević and Dimitrije Tucović condemned the atrocities against Albanians and supported Albanian self-determination.

Durham wrote about Isa Boletini and how Dragutin Dimitrijević (Apis) and his friends betrayed the Albanians after they revolted against the Ottomans: "Having used their ammunition in the recent rebellions, the bulk of the Albanians were practically unarmed, and were pitilessly massacred by the invading armies. Apis and his friends who had posed as friends of the Albanians now spared neither man, woman nor child. How many were massacred in Kosovo vilayet will never be known".

To investigate the crimes, the Carnegie Endowment for International Peace formed a commission which was sent to the Balkans in 1913. Summing up the situation in Albanian areas, the commission concluded:

Serbian territorial claims on the region were complicated by the issue of war crimes committed by Serbian forces which were part of the International Commission on the Balkan Wars investigation. The report was received negatively by Serb historians and officials, although the Serbian side was treated with restraint compared with others who had participated in the conflict. The socialist press in Serbia referred to crimes, and Serbian socialist Dimitrije Tucović wrote about the Serbian campaign in Kosovo and northern Albania. The Serbian social-democratic newspaper Radnica novice reported that innocent Albanians were plundered and their villages devastated.

Although Tucović reminded his Serbian readers in 1913 of Karl Marx's "prophetic" quote ("The nation that oppresses another nation forges its own chains"), the Serbian Orthodox Church had whipped up nationalist hatred of Albanians. In his book Srbija i Arbanija, he wrote:

During the second half of the twentieth century, historian Vladimir Dedijer researched Serbian foreign relations of the era. Dedijer equated Serbian actions (such as Nikola Pašić's description of eyewitness accounts as foreign propaganda) with those of European colonial armies in South America and Africa. The British and German press published articles about the large number of Albanian deaths in Albania and Kosovo, and the attempts by the Serbian government to conceal the reality from its people by censorship. An 18 January 1913 Times of London article reported that 25,000 Albanians were killed in northeastern Albania by Serbian forces.

Russia played a significant part in the territorial division of Albanian regions and propaganda about crimes committed by Serbs. Russian foreign minister Sergey Sazonov warned Pašić a number of times through the Serbian representative in St. Petersburg about the need to disavow every single case, like Gjakova (where Serbian forces reportedly shot 300 Albanians. Sazonov repeatedly told the Serbs that the Austrians were prepared to accept Gjakova as part of Serbia if no casualties occurred. Russia also helped Serbia gain the towns of Debar, Prizren and Pec from Albania (and tried to gain Gjakova), and Austria-Hungary attempted to retain the remaining territory for Albania.

The Russian newspaper Novoye vremya refused to acknowledge Serbian atrocities against Albanian civilians in Skopje and Prizren in 1913, citing local Catholic priests who said that the Serb army had not committed a single act of violence against the civil population. American relief agent B. Peele Willett wrote in his 1914 report, "The Christian Work Fall":

The Habsburg envoy in Belgrade said that Serbian authorities sponsored and tolerated harsh treatment of Albanians (pillaging, arson, and executions) in the "liberated lands". The German newspaper Frankfurter Zeitung obtained reports corroborated by impartial European observers that massacres were committed against various local communities in Macedonia and Albania by Bulgarians, Serbs and Greeks. According to the newspaper, the Serbian position was that the Albanian population "must be eradicated".

The Near East published a 1921 article about Albanian deputies who said at the 1 August Ambassador Conference in Tirana that between 1913 and 1920, Serbian forces killed 85,676 Albanian civilians in Kosovo and a number of villages had been burned. They also said that the Black Hand brought Russian colonists to settle in the regions where Albanians had been killed or expelled.

Dayrell Crackanthorpe, a British official, wrote to Edward Grey from Belgrade on 25 September 1913 that an Albanian uprising against Serbian forces was due (according to the Austrians) to Serbian occupation and civilian massacres. A Romanian physician wrote in the Bucharest newspaper Adevărul on 6 January 1913 that the actions of the Serbian army in Kosovo were "much more frightening than one could imagine". As the resistance in Lumë against Serbian troops continued, European public sentiment turned against Belgrade. In 2006, Günter Schödl wrote that the atrocities in Kosovo were part of the first recorded ethnic cleansing in the Balkans.

Denial 
War crimes committed by Serb troops outraged Serbian officials and historians; despite Serbian, British and German coverage of the atrocities, however, Nikola Pašić tried to present them as an "invention of foreign propaganda". Denial continued, and the atrocities were called "a struggle for freedom" (leading to a popular quip about the "final liberation of the cradle of Serbdoom and occupied brothers").

Hague Conventions of 1899 and 1907
Although the Kingdom of Serbia signed the Hague Conventions of 1899 and 1907, it did not follow the 1907 treaty; Muslim civilians in Kosovo were ill-treated and subject to excessive violence.

Aftermath
Reliable statistics exist for the number of military casualties of the Balkan Wars. A research gap exists for civilian victims (often members of a targeted ethnic or religious group) because the statistics have been interpreted for partisan purposes. The wars created many refugees, some of whom fled to Istanbul or Anatolia. After the creation of Albania, Albanian refugees (particularly Muslims) also fled to Turkey. Serbian control was challenged by the fall 1913 Ohrid–Debar uprising; its suppression by Serbian forces resulted in tens of thousands of Albanian refugees arriving in Albania from western Macedonia. According to Freundlich, the Albanian refugee population in the town of Shkodër numbered 8,000-10,000; there were 7,000 refugees each in Shala and Iballë. Edvin Pezo wrote that a portion of the large refugee population in northern Albania probably came from Kosovo. Lack of assistance from the new Albanian government and Albanian immigration restrictions by the Ottomans drove many refugees to return home, often to destroyed houses. Survivors of the Balkan Wars, such as those in Skopje, often did not talk about their experiences.

As a result of the 1913 Treaty of London, which assigneded the former Ottoman lands to Serbia, Montenegro and Greece (most of the Kosovo Vilayet was awarded to Serbia), an independent Albania was recognised; Greece, Serbia and Montenegro agreed to withdraw from the new Principality of Albania. The principality included only about half of the territory inhabited by ethnic Albanians, however, and many Albanians remained in neighboring countries. Two Serbian Army invasions of Albania (in 1913 and May 1915) triggered Albanian sniper attacks on the army during its retreat, partially as retribution for Serbian brutality in the First Balkan War.

The Balkan Wars resulted in Serbian forces seeing themselves as "liberators", and non-Serbs became concerned about their place in the new reality. The current Serbian position on the Balkan Wars is that they were a "final" struggle to liberate "the cradle of Serbdom and [its] occupied brothers."

Violent events, such as those in Skopje, are omitted from Macedonian and Yugoslav histories. Most Albanian and Kosovan history books present the attack on the Ottoman state to liberate Greeks, Serbs and Albanians from government misrule in a positive light, viewing the arrival (and conduct) of Serbian, Greek and Montenegrin military forces in Albania as chauvinistic and unwarranted. The "liberation" of the Albanian population by military force (especially by the Serbian and Montenegrin armies of the Balkan League) is described as an "invasion of enemies" or longstanding "foes". In Albania and Kosovo, this understanding of the Balkan Wars is part of the educational curriculum.

In 1998–99, war crimes similar to those in 1912 against the Albanian population were committed. These events have deeply affected Albania–Serbia relations.

See also
 Albania during the Balkan Wars
 Anti-Albanian sentiment
 War crimes in the 1999 Kosovo War

References

Further reading
 Report of the International Commission to Inquire into the Causes and Conduct of the Balkan War

1912 in Albania
1913 in Albania
Albanians in the Balkan Wars
Balkan Wars
Balkan Wars
20th century in Serbia
Serbian war crimes in the Balkan Wars
Anti-Albanian sentiment
Balkan Wars
Albanians in the Balkan Wars
Massacres in 1912
Massacres in 1913
1912 murders in Europe
1913 murders in Europe